The Santiam Wagon Road was a freight route in the U.S. state of Oregon between the Willamette Valley and Central Oregon regions from 1865 to the 1930s. It is considered one of the most important historical routes in the state. Officially known as the Willamette Valley and Cascade Mountain Wagon Road, the Santiam Wagon Road was built between 1861 and 1868 and operated as a toll road until 1915. In 1925, the road was turned over to the State of Oregon for use as a highway. U.S. Route 20 closely follows the original route of the wagon road.

See also 
 Barlow Road
 Hogg Rock
 Santiam Pass
 Oregon Route 58

References

External links

Historic trails and roads in Oregon
Cascade Range
Transportation in Marion County, Oregon
Deschutes National Forest
Willamette National Forest
National Register of Historic Places in Linn County, Oregon
National Register of Historic Places in Deschutes County, Oregon
Historic districts on the National Register of Historic Places in Oregon
1865 establishments in Oregon
Roads on the National Register of Historic Places in Oregon